Team Cherry could mean:

Team Cherry (developer), an Australian video game developer and publisher of Hollow Knight and Hollow Knight: Silksong.
 An ice hockey team coached by Don Cherry in the CHL/NHL Top Prospects Game.